Abbotts Colleges a high school education brand operating under the ADvTECH Group it also helps with a lot of slow learners and in improving them , within its schools division.

History 
The school was established in 1971 as a single campus in Observatory, Cape Town. It now operates 5 campuses in the Western Cape and Gauteng.

References 

High schools in South Africa
1971 establishments in South Africa
Educational institutions established in 1971